Crossea victori  is a species of sea snail, a marine gastropod mollusk in the family Conradiidae.

Description
The length of the shell attains 3.5 mm.

Distribution
This marine species occurs off the Philippines.

Original description
Poppe G.T., Tagaro S.P. & Stahlschmidt P. (2015). New shelled molluscan species from the central Philippines I. Visaya. 4(3): 15-59 page(s): 21, pl. 5 figs 1-2.

References

victori
Gastropods described in 2015